Babasultan Dam is a dam in Bursa Province, Turkey, built between 1996 and 2009. It is named after the nearby village of Babasultan. 

The dam is earth and rock fill with a body volume of 2,075 million m3. The river bed height is 53 m, lake volume is 15.80 hm3 at normal water elevations. The dam provides irrigation services to an area of 7,058 hectares.

See also 
List of dams and reservoirs in Turkey

External links 
DSI

Dams in Bursa Province
Dams completed in 2002
2002 establishments in Turkey